South Imilit Island is one of the uninhabited Arctic islands in the Kivalliq Region, Nunavut, Canada. It is one of several islands in Chesterfield Inlet.

References

Islands of Chesterfield Inlet
Uninhabited islands of Kivalliq Region